Spajić is a Serbo-Croatian surname. Notable people with the surname include:

Alejandro Spajić (born 1976), Argentine volleyball player
Ljubiša Spajić (1926–2004), former Serbian footballer 
Svetlana Spajić (born 1971), Serbian traditional singer, performer, pedagogue, cultural activist and translator
Uroš Spajić (born 1993), Serbian footballer

See also
Stadion NŠC Stjepan Spajić

Croatian surnames
Serbian surnames
Slavic-language surnames
Patronymic surnames